Branislav Danilović (Serbian Cyrillic: Бранислав Даниловић; born 24 June 1988) is a Serbian football goalkeeper who plays for Diósgyőri VTK.

Club statistics

Updated to games played as of 20 May 2021.

External links
 UEFA profile
 Srbijafudbal profile
 

1988 births
Living people
Footballers from Belgrade
Serbian footballers
Association football goalkeepers
Serbia under-21 international footballers
FK Rad players
FK BSK Borča players
Puskás Akadémia FC players
Fehérvár FC players
Debreceni VSC players
Diósgyőri VTK players
Serbian SuperLiga players
Nemzeti Bajnokság I players
Serbian expatriate footballers
Expatriate footballers in Hungary
Serbian expatriate sportspeople in Hungary